United Nations Security Council Resolution 108, adopted unanimously on September 8, 1955, after another report by the Chief of Staff of the United Nations Truce Supervision Organization in Palestine, the Council noted the acceptance by both parties of the appeal of the Chief of Staff for an unconditional ceasefire.  The Council went on to endorse the view of the Chief of Staff that the armed forces of both parties should be clearly and effectively separated by the measures he proposed and declared that freedom of movement must be afforded to UN observers in the area.

See also
 Auja al-Hafir
 List of United Nations Security Council Resolutions 101 to 200 (1953–1965)
 United Nations Security Council Resolution 107

References
Text of the Resolution at undocs.org

External links
 

 0108
 0108
 0108
1955 in Egypt
1955 in Israel
September 1955 events